John Morris  (born 5 March 1950) is an educator and former association football goalkeeper who represented New Zealand at international level. He served as the headmaster of Auckland Grammar School for 19 years before his retirement in 2012.

Football career
Morris made his full All Whites debut in a 2-4 loss to New Caledonia on 18 July 1971 and ended his international playing career with eight A-international caps to his credit, his final cap being an appearance in a 0-1 loss to Indonesia on 18 March 1973.

Morris also represented New Zealand in soccer administration and was Chairman of New Zealand Soccer between 2002 and 2008.  He was also a long-serving member of the FIFA Technical and Development Committee.

In 2013, Morris became chair of the independent group Friends of Football

Academic career
Morris graduated with a MA(Hons) in History from The University of Auckland in 1972. He gained a Diploma from Auckland College of Education in 1973.

Morris was appointed Headmaster of Auckland Grammar School in July 1993 after previously being Principal of Takapuna Grammar School for nearly four years. He is founding Chairman of the Association of Cambridge Schools in New Zealand and was a member of the University of Auckland Council for seven years.

Morris officially announced his retirement on 6 December 2011, taking effect in September 2012.

In 1999, he was awarded a Woolf Fisher Fellowship for Outstanding Educational Leadership.

In the 2013 New Year Honours, Morris was appointed an Officer of the New Zealand Order of Merit for services to education.

In 2019, Morris was appointed Executive Principal of Crimson Education.

References

External links

1950 births
Living people
New Zealand association footballers
New Zealand international footballers
Association football goalkeepers
University of Auckland alumni
New Zealand association football chairmen and investors
New Zealand referees and umpires
Officers of the New Zealand Order of Merit
New Zealand educators
Heads of schools in New Zealand
1973 Oceania Cup players